Hadena sancta is a species of moth of the  family Noctuidae. It is found in Spain, Corsica, Sardinia, Malta, North Africa, Israel, Lebanon, Syria, Jordan, Cyprus, Turkey, Saudi Arabia and Yemen.

Description
Warren states darker and greyer [ than Hadena perplexa as E. nisus Germ. (21 a). Like irregularis, buffgrey brown without the paleochreous tinge; submarginal line
dentate and preceded by long dentate black marks; claviform stigma definite but small and brown; hindwing fuscous. The type form is from Sicily only]  with the stigmata filled
in with brown, occurs in Spain.

Subspecies
Hadena sancta sancta (Libya, Algeria)
Hadena sancta protai (Italy)
Hadena sancta turca (Turkey)
Hadena sancta cypriaca (Cyprus)
Hadena sancta atrifusa

Biology

Adults are on wing from March to May in one generation in Israel.

The larvae feed on the seeds of  Silene species.

References

External links
 Hadeninae of Israel

Hadena
Moths of Europe
Moths of Africa
Moths of Asia
Moths described in 1859